Benjamin Bejbaum is a French entrepreneur and computer programmer, who is particularly known for being co-founder of Dailymotion video-sharing site  with Olivier Poitrey.  He was the CEO of the company. During that time, he was responsible for the strategy of the start-up.

Life and education
Bejbaum was born on November 20, 1976, in Paris. He attended Gérard de Nerval High School, Luzarches (Val-d'Oise). He then enrolled at the university in Villetaneuse (Seine-Saint-Denis) to study applied mathematics and information sciences.

DailyMotion 
In March 2005, Bejbaum founded Dailymotion, along with Olivier Poitrey. A year later, the video site got $9.5 million from Atlas Ventures and Partech International a year later. After hiring Zaleski from QXL as executive chairman, he got $34 million led by Adventure Partners and AGF Private Equity in August 2007.

In December 2008, Benjamin Bejbaum left the day-to-day operations at the company while Mark Zalesky took his position. After that, he continued on the board of the start-up.

References

French computer programmers
1976 births
Living people